Heliconia × flabellata is a species of plant in the family Heliconiaceae. It is endemic to Ecuador. Its natural habitat is subtropical or tropical moist lowland forest. It is apparently a hybrid, H. episcopalis × H. rostrata.

References

Flora of Ecuador
flabellata
Data deficient plants
Hybrid plants
Taxonomy articles created by Polbot